Tennis at the 2003 Pan American Games was played at the Centro Nacional de Tenis.

Medal summary

Medal table

External links
Official site

 
Pan American Games
Events at the 2003 Pan American Games
2003